Tybor is a surname. Notable people with the surname include:

Patrik Tybor (born 1987), Slovak cyclist
Radoslav Tybor (born 1989), Slovak ice hockey player